Enganeyundashaane is a 1984 Indian Malayalam-language film, directed by Balu Kiriyath and produced by Renji Mathew. The film stars Mammootty, Thilakan, Menaka and C. I. Paul . The film has musical score by Raveendran.

Cast
Mammootty as Gopikuttan Pilla
Thilakan as Viswanathan Nair
Menaka as Sunantha Viswanathan
C. I. Paul as Viswanathan Menon
Kundara Johnny as Suresh
Kunchan
Thodupuzha Vasanthi as Radhika
 Subha as Prabha Viswanathan
 Kannor Sreelatha as Alice Thomasukutty
Maniyanpilla Raju as Sundarapandiyan/Thomasukutty

Soundtrack
The music was composed by Raveendran and the lyrics were written by Balu Kiriyath.

References

External links
 

1984 films
1980s Malayalam-language films